The 1949 Sabena DC-3 Crash was the crash of a Douglas DC-3 of the Belgian airline Sabena in Aulnay-sous-Bois, France, on 18 December 1949. None of the eight people on board survived the incident.

Aircraft
The Douglas DC-3 involved was built in 1946 with serial number 10241 and registration OO-AUQ and was used by the Belgian airline company Sabena from 12 August 1946 until its destruction in 1949.

Crash 
The Sabena flight departed Le Bourget Airport bound for Zaventem Airport with four passengers and four crew members on board at 20.30 pm on 18 December 1949. However, shortly after takeoff while still climbing, one of the wings separated and sent the aircraft in an uncontrolled dive towards the ground. The plane crashed 4 km southeast of the airport near Aulnay-sous-Bois after clipping a house and burst into flames. Firefighters, Police officers and airport employees reached the crash site to aid any survivors but it was discovered that all eight onboard had perished in the flaming wreckage. The two occupants of the clipped house were unharmed.

Probable cause
The cause of the crash was determined to be caused by the in-flight structural failure of the wing, but the reason for the wing's failure remains unknown.

Aftermath
The aircraft was destroyed by the impact and post-crash fire and the bodies of the victims were recovered by rescue workers.

References

Sabena accidents and incidents
Airliner accidents and incidents caused by in-flight structural failure
December 1949 events in Europe
1949 in France
Aviation accidents and incidents in 1949
Accidents and incidents involving the Douglas DC-3
Aviation accidents and incidents in France